Blue River Township is one of twelve townships in Harrison County, Indiana, United States. As of the 2010 census, its population was 2,064 and it contained 889 housing units.

Geography
The stream of Baldy Creek runs through this township.

Cities and towns
 Milltown (east half)

Unincorporated towns
 Depauw
 Hancock Chapel
 Lowdell
(This list is based on USGS data and may include former settlements.)

Adjacent townships
 Posey Township, Washington County (north)
 Morgan Township (east)
 Jackson Township (southeast)
 Spencer Township (south)
 Whiskey Run Township, Crawford County (west)

Cemeteries
The township contains four major cemeteries: Boston, Breedlove, Mount Zion and Reno.

Major highways
 U.S. Route 150
 Indiana State Road 64
 Indiana State Road 337

References
 
 United States Census Bureau cartographic boundary files

External links

 Indiana Township Association
 United Township Association of Indiana

Townships in Harrison County, Indiana
Townships in Indiana